Klimeschia paghmanella is a moth in the family Douglasiidae. It was described by Reinhard Gaedike in 1974. It is found in Afghanistan.

References

Moths described in 1974
Douglasiidae